Ronan Michael Murray (born 12 September 1991) is an Irish former professional footballer who played as a forward. Born in County Mayo, he has played in the Football League for Ipswich Town, Torquay United, Swindon Town, Plymouth Argyle and Notts County, and in the League of Ireland for Galway United, Dundalk, Sligo Rovers and Drogheda United. Murray was capped by the Republic of Ireland from under-16 to under-21 level. He is currently playing Gaelic football with Belmullet GAA

Club career

Early years
Murray started playing for the Erris United youth system at the age of 12. After being spotted by former Ipswich Town player Robin Turner, he had a trial with Ipswich in the summer of 2007 and agreed to join the club the following year.

Ipswich Town
Having joined the club's academy, Murray scored a total of 36 goals in 56 appearances for the youth team in his first two seasons with Ipswich. He also scored 13 times in 29 reserve team games. Murray signed his first professional contract in 2010 after being among seven academy players offered terms in April. He scored on his first team debut in a 3–2 League Cup win at Exeter City in August. Murray came on as a second-half substitute, with Ipswich trailing, to equalise with a "looping header" and was then involved in both David Norris goals to win the game in extra time. "Of all the strikers at our club, he is probably the most natural goalscorer we've got," said manager Roy Keane. Describing Murray's goal, he said "it wasn't even a chance and that's what good strikers do."

Murray made his first appearance in the Football League four days later against Burnley, but found first team opportunities limited for the rest of the 2010–11 campaign. He continued to be prolific for the reserves, scoring 11 goals in 16 appearances that season, and joined Torquay United on loan in March 2011. He scored once in seven appearances, a "clinical finish" against Cheltenham Town, and was then recalled by manager Paul Jewell in April. "I really enjoyed my time at Torquay but I'm an Ipswich Town player and want to play games here," said Murray after signing a new one-year contract. He appeared in the starting line-up for the first time, in his last game of the season, at the end of the month against Preston North End.

Despite scoring nine goals in 10 reserve team appearances the following season, Murray failed to feature in a first team game for Ipswich in 2011–12. A loan move to Gillingham in September fell through before he joined Swindon Town on loan in November. "To be honest, we are missing a player like him," said Swindon manager Paolo Di Canio. "He's a player who doesn't have a high size but he's very mobile. He's quick but he isn't nasty – he has a good character." Murray scored two goals in ten league and cup appearances, against Southend United and Morecambe, before returning to Ipswich in January. Ipswich rejected an offer of around £100,000 from Swindon to sign Murray on a permanent deal and gave him a new one-year contract. He then returned to Swindon on loan for the rest of the season. "I'm obviously delighted to have been given a new contract here," said Murray. "It's been great to be involved down there week after week and that's what I need at this stage of my career." He scored two more goals, against Burton Albion and Barnet, and appeared in the 2012 Football League Trophy Final defeat to Chesterfield.

Murray returned to Ipswich at the end of the campaign having helped Swindon win the League Two title. "I reckon this is my first season as a regular in the Football League and I am in a team that has won promotion," he said. "I have learnt that you have to be professional in your preparation, especially if you have a game on Saturday and then Tuesday. You have to recover well and I have learnt how to do that too." He made his first appearance for Ipswich in nearly 16 months at the start of the 2012–13 season against Blackpool in August. Murray scored four more goals, in eight appearances, for the club's reserve team before joining Plymouth Argyle on loan in January for the rest of the campaign. "I'm very pleased to get Ronan in. He comes very highly recommended," said Argyle manager John Sheridan. "He's a good intelligent footballer who scores goals and he did well when he went to Swindon last year in a promotion-winning side." Murray scored one goal in 13 appearances for the club, a "close-range finish" against Barnet in March. At the end of the season, Murray was released by Ipswich when his contract expired. In five years with the club he scored once in 14 matches.

Notts County
Murray signed a short-term contract with Notts County in August 2013 after a trial period. He made an impressive start at his new club, scoring 9 goals as the team avoided relegation to League Two, and his performances earned him a new contract in July 2014. His time at Notts County was beset by injury problems, with a fractured pubic bone proving particularly problematic. Despite this, Murray still featured in 68 games for the EFL side. He left Notts County in July 2016 when his contract expired.

Galway United
Murray returned to his native west of Ireland when he signed for Galway United in December 2016 ahead of the 2017 League of Ireland Premier Division campaign. Murray scored 13 goals in 32 league games for Galway United, including 3 in the month of August, picking up the League of Ireland Player of the Month award, but he couldn't save them from relegation in the restructured league of 10 clubs.

Dundalk
Following his impressive season in Galway, on 28 November 2017 it was announced that Murray would make a return to full time football by joining league champions Dundalk for the 2018 campaign. He scored a brace on his club debut against Cork City in the President's Cup on 11 February. It proved to be a tough year for Murray personally. Despite the club retaining the 2018 League of Ireland Premier Division and winning the 2018 FAI Cup, he only started 11 league games, and wasn't getting as many minutes on the pitch as were desired. He admitted that he had a decision to make in the close season. He left the club having scored 9 goals in 32 appearances in all competitions

Sligo Rovers
On 26 November 2018, Murray signed a 2-year contract with Sligo Rovers for the 2019 League of Ireland Premier Division season. He struggled to break into the first team, and after just 2 goals in 33 games, he departed in December 2020

Drogheda United
After a brief trial with Saint Patrick's Athletic, On 24 February 2021 newly promoted side Drogheda United announced the signing of Murray for the 2021 season. He scored his first goal for the club, a smashing free kick, in a friendly fixture against his former side Dundalk in the Louth derby on 6 March. Murray was a regular in the side that season, playing 27 league matches. His only Premier Division goal came in the form of another free kick, against Longford Town on 24 May. He left the club upon expiry of his 1-year contract in December

Career Break
Since leaving the Drogs, Ronan Murray has taken a career break from football, and has explored other ventures, taking up Gaelic football with his local club Belmullet back in Co. Mayo

International career
Murray represented the Republic of Ireland at under-16, under-18, under-19 and under-21 level. He made his debut for the under-21 team in March 2011 against Portugal.

Career statistics

Honours
Swindon Town
Football League Two: 2011–12

Dundalk
League of Ireland Premier Division: 2018

Individual
PFAI Team of the Year: 2017 Premier Division

References

External links

1991 births
Living people
Association footballers from County Mayo
Republic of Ireland association footballers
Republic of Ireland youth international footballers
Republic of Ireland under-21 international footballers
Association football forwards
Ipswich Town F.C. players
Torquay United F.C. players
Swindon Town F.C. players
Plymouth Argyle F.C. players
Notts County F.C. players
Galway United F.C. players
Dundalk F.C. players
Sligo Rovers F.C. players
Drogheda United F.C. players
English Football League players
League of Ireland players